Protoprisma is a genus of sponge known from the Burgess Shale.

References

External links 
 Burgess Shale species 107

Hexactinellida genera
Prehistoric sponge genera
Burgess Shale sponges

Cambrian genus extinctions